Sils is a municipality in the comarca of Selva, in Catalonia, Spain. It is situated next to a former lake, which was drained in the nineteenth century. Autopista AP-7 and road N-II run through the municipality, and there is a RENFE railway station on the line between Barcelona and Girona.

Demography

Lake Sils

Formerly a 7 km2 lake, known as Llac de Sils or Estany de Sils existed close to this town, but it was desiccated in the 19th century and only a few residual wetlands remain. Presently some efforts are under way to try to reestablish a pond restoring a sample of the original vegetation.

References

 Panareda Clopés, Josep Maria; Rios Calvet, Jaume; Rabella Vives, Josep Maria (1989). Guia de Catalunya, Barcelona: Caixa de Catalunya.  (Spanish).  (Catalan).

External links
Official website 
 Government data pages 

Municipalities in Selva
Populated places in Selva